Xiàng is a Chinese surname. It is listed 125th in the Song dynasty classic text Hundred Family Surnames.

Notable people
 Xiang Bo (項伯), noble of the Chu state
 Xiang Chong (項充), a fictional character in the novel Water Margin
 Xiang Huaicheng (项怀诚), Chinese economist and former minister of finance of China
 Jing Xiang (项晶), Chinese German actress
 Xiang Liang (項梁), rebel leader in the Qin dynasty
 Xiang Shengmo (項聖謨), Chinese painter in the Ming Dynasty
 Xiang Yu (項羽), prominent warlord in the late Qin dynasty
 Xiang Zhuang (項莊), a younger cousin of Xiang Yu

References

Chinese-language surnames
Individual Chinese surnames